Ben Edward Stevenson (born 23 March 1997) is an English professional footballer who plays as a midfielder for League One club Forest Green Rovers.

Stevenson is a graduate of the Coventry City Academy. He spent 13 years with the club, joining at the age of eight. He made his professional debut in August 2016 and made 48 appearances for the club. In January 2018, he was sold to Championship side Wolverhampton Wanderers. He was immediately loaned out to Colchester United, and then joined Wolves' Spanish affiliate club Jumilla on loan for the first-half of 2018–19. In January 2019, he rejoined Colchester United on a permanent basis.

Career
Born in Leicester, Stevenson joined the Coventry City Academy at the age of eight. He signed on as a scholar in July 2013, and signed his first professional contract in 2015.

Stevenson made his professional debut on 9 August 2016, playing 120 minutes in Coventry's 3–2 extra time win over Portsmouth in the League Cup. He scored his first professional goal on 18 October 2016 during a 2–1 win over Oxford United. He scored his second goal for Coventry in their 2–1 home defeat by Milton Keynes Dons on 26 November 2016, but was sent off for the first time in his career after 74-minutes for a high challenge on Dean Lewington. He helped the club to the EFL Trophy and played in the final at Wembley Stadium as City beat Oxford United 2–1.

After making 36 appearances in his debut season, Stevenson was limited to twelve appearances in the first-half of the 2017–18 season through both injury and falling down the pecking order at the club.

On 31 January 2018, Stevenson signed a -year deal with Championship side Wolverhampton Wanderers for an undisclosed fee. He was immediately loaned out to Coventry's League Two rivals Colchester United for the remainder of the 2017–18 season.

Stevenson made his Colchester United debut on 3 February 2018, coming on as a substitute for Sean Murray before scoring the game's opening goal ten minutes after his arrival on the pitch. Colchester went on to win the match against Newport County 2–0. He made 13 appearances for the U's, scoring twice.

On 31 August 2018, Stevenson was one of nine Wolves players sent to their Spanish affiliate club Jumilla on loan until the end of the 2018–19 season. He made 15 appearances for the club.

Colchester United re-signed Stevenson on a permanent basis on 30 January 2019, signing a -year deal from Wolves. He made his second debut for the club on 2 February, starting in their 4–0 win at Northampton Town.

An excellent Carabao Cup run with some notable wins against Premiership teams Crystal Palace and Tottenham Hotspur took them to the quarter finals against Manchester United at Old Trafford eventually losing 3-0.

On 7 June 2021, Stevenson announced he would be leaving Colchester at the end of his contract after making almost 100 appearances for the U's.

Stevenson signed for Forest Green Rovers on a two-year deal on 21 June 2021 Forest Green won promotion to League One as champions in the 21/22 season.

Career statistics

Honours
Coventry City
EFL Trophy: 2016–17

Forest Green Rovers
League Two: 2021–22

References

External links

1997 births
Living people
Footballers from Leicester
English footballers
Association football midfielders
Coventry City F.C. players
Wolverhampton Wanderers F.C. players
Colchester United F.C. players
FC Jumilla players
Forest Green Rovers F.C. players
English Football League players
Segunda División B players
English expatriate footballers
English expatriate sportspeople in Spain
Expatriate footballers in Spain